The Idolmaster is a series of raising simulation and rhythm video games created by Bandai Namco Games (formerly Namco). Its first game premiered in Japan in 2005 as an arcade game, and the series has grown to numerous ports, sequels and spin-offs across multiple video game consoles. Each game in the main series deals with the training of prospective pop idols on their way to stardom. The main talent agency featured in the series is 765 Production, and other studios introduced in later games include 876 Production featured in The Idolmaster Dearly Stars, and 961 Production originally introduced in The Idolmaster SP, but which later returns in The Idolmaster 2.

The games in the series feature a variety of music sung by the idols, many of which are featured in multiple games either initially or as downloadable content (DLC). As of the release of The Idolmaster One For All in May 2014, the series includes an initial setlist of 73 songs, and each game initially contains a limited number of these songs. For example, the arcade version of The Idolmaster contains 10 of these songs, and this is increased to 16 with its Xbox 360 port. Songs initially released on various music albums and singles for the series have also been featured in the games. Starting with The Idolmaster Live For You! in 2008, DLC packs have been released which add to a game's initial setlist of songs. As of June 2015, 66 of the 73 songs have also been released in DLC packs. In addition, there are 43 more songs that are only available in DLC packs, which brings the total number of songs featured in the series to 116 songs. Aside from a few exceptions, none of the songs have set singers—almost all of the songs can be sung by any one of the idols in a given game.

Initial setlist
There are 73 songs initially available across the entire series. There is a large amount of overlap between the songs as many of them are featured in multiple games. In addition to the original versions of these songs, 16 remixes are also included in The Idolmaster Live For You! which have to be unlocked by satisfying certain events in the game. The Idolmaster 2 also features a remix of the song "The Idolmaster", in addition to two songs that also have to be unlocked. The original arcade game has 10 songs, and this is increased to 16 in the Xbox 360 port. Not counting the remix versions, Live For You! contains the same 16 songs from the Xbox 360 port. The three versions of The Idolmaster SP each contain 20 songs, though 17 of them are common to all versions. The Idolmaster Dearly Stars contains 10 songs. The Xbox 360 version of The Idolmaster 2 contains 18 songs, and its PlayStation 3 version contains 23 songs. The three versions of The Idolmaster Shiny Festa each contain 20 songs, though 6 of them are common to all versions. One song is initially available in The Idolmaster Shiny TV. Lastly, The Idolmaster One For All contains 21 songs.

Downloadable content
Starting with The Idolmaster Live For You! in 2008, downloadable content (DLC) packs have been released which add to a game's initial setlist of songs. The packs are available either through the Xbox Live Marketplace or the PlayStation Store depending on the game. As of June 2015, 109 songs, including various remixes, have been released in DLC packs, 66 of which are also initially available in one of the games in the series. This includes "The World is All One!!", which is available for The Idolmaster Shiny Festa via a product code contained in the limited edition of the three game versions. The remaining 43 songs are only available in DLC packs.

From the initial setlist

Download-only songs

Notes

 Remix-A
 Remix-B
 2nd-mix
 The song must be unlocked

References

Lists of songs in music video games
Songs